The 2021 Ladbrokes Players Championship Finals was the fourteenth edition of the PDC darts tournament, which saw the top 64 players from the Players Championship events of 2021 taking part. The tournament took place from 26–28 November 2021 at the Butlin's Resort, Minehead, returning to its usual venue after  being held behind closed doors at the Ricoh Arena in Coventry in 2020.

Michael van Gerwen was the two-time defending champion after defeating Mervyn King 11–10 in the 2020 final, but lost to Peter Wright at the quarter-final stage. This was the first time since 2014 that van Gerwen failed to reach the final.

Wright went on to win the tournament for the first time, defeating Ryan Searle 11–10 in the final.

Prize money
The 2021 Players Championship Finals had a total prize fund of £500,000, the same amount that was available in 2019 and 2020.

The following is the breakdown of the fund:

Qualification
The top 64 players from the Players Championships Order of Merit qualified, which is solely based on prize money won in the 30 Players Championships events during the season.

On 23 November, it was announced that Jamie Hughes was forced to withdraw after testing positive for COVID-19. His place in the draw was taken by Jelle Klaasen, who was next on the list.

The following players qualified:

Top 64 in the Players Championship Order of Merit

Draw

Finals

Top half

Section 1

Section 2

Bottom half

Section 3

Section 4

References

Players Championship Finals
Players
Players
Players